The Four Points by Sheraton Brisbane is a hotel tower located at 99 Mary Street in Brisbane, Australia.

The 33-storey,  skyscraper is located in the heart of the Brisbane central business district adjacent to the Botanic Gardens and the Parliament House.

The hotel tower includes 246 rooms of average size of 27 square metres. The hotel facilities include a restaurant, a cafe bar and 200 square metres of function space.

The hotel is managed by the Felicity Hotels group under the international hotel brand Four Points by Sheraton.

The hotel was completed in early March 2014.

See also

List of tallest buildings in Brisbane

References

External links 
 Building at The Skyscraper Center database
 Official webpage

Skyscrapers in Brisbane
Hotels in Brisbane
2014 establishments in Australia
Hotels established in 2014
Hotel buildings completed in 2014
Mary Street, Brisbane
Skyscraper hotels in Australia